Westwell Leacon is a hamlet in the civil parish of Charing near Ashford in Kent, England. Its most famous resident is international Cyclocross star Ian Field.

Villages in Kent